Giuseppe Schirò (1865-1927) was an Arbëreshë writer, publicist, and activist of the Albanian National Awakening.

Giuseppe Schirò may also refer to:
 Giuseppe Schirò (archbishop) (1690-1769), archbishop of Durazzo
 Giuseppe Schirò (junior) (1905–1984), Arbëreshë writer
 Giuseppe Schirò Di Maggio (born 1944), writer
 Giuseppe Schirò, author of the 1834 paper Rapporti tra l'Epiro e il Regno delle due Sicilie, see Giuseppe Crispi